Coria del Río is a small town near Seville, on the shores of Guadalquivir river.

History
Early in the 17th century, daimyō Date Masamune of Sendai sent a delegation led by Hasekura Tsunenaga (1571–1622) to Europe. In 1613, Hasekura and the delegates visited the Spanish court of King Philip III and the Vatican. An embassy was established and six samurai stayed in Spain. Approximately 650 of Coria's 24,000 residents, as reported in 2003, use the surname Japón (originally Hasekura de Japón), identifying them as the descendants of the first Japanese official envoy to Spain. The name first appeared on an official document in 1646. Some babies born within the town are known to display the mongolian spot which is common in Asians.

A statue of Hasekura Tsunenaga was donated to the city by Japan in 1992 and stands watch over the river.

The football club Coria CF hails from Coria del Río.

References

External links
 "Coria del Río"

Municipalities of the Province of Seville
Guadalquivir
Japanese diaspora in Europe